Séez is a commune in the Savoie department in the Auvergne-Rhône-Alpes region in south-eastern France.

It is located In the Tarentaise valley, between the Little St Bernard Pass and the edge of the Vanoise National Park.

See also
Communes of the Savoie department

References

External links

 Official site

Communes of Savoie